Richard Byrne may refer to:

Richard Byrne (politician) (died 1942), Irish nationalist politician in Northern Ireland
Richard William Byrne, British psychologist and neuroscientist
Richie Byrne (born 1981), Irish association footballer
Richard Byrne, musician in the Canadian folk music band The Halifax Three

See also
Richard Byrnes (1832–1864), Irish-American officer in the United States Army